The 2022–23 New Orleans Privateers women's basketball team represents the University of New Orleans during the 2022–23 NCAA Division I women's basketball season. The Privateers are led by twelfth year head coach Keeshawn Davenport and play their home games at the Lakefront Arena located on the UNO campus in New Orleans, Louisiana. They are members of the Southland Conference.

Previous season
The Privateers finished the 2021-22 season with a 5-18 overall record and a 3-11 Southland Conference record, seventh place in the conference.  They participated in the 2022 Southland Conference women's basketball tournament as the No. 7 seeded team.  They wont their first round tournament game against No. 6 seeded Northwestern State 57-48.  Their season ended with a quarterfinal loss to No. 4 seeded Southeastern 66-80.

Preseason polls

Southland Conference Poll
The Southland Conference released its preseason poll on October 25, 2022. Receiving 47 votes overall, the Privateers were picked to finish ninth in the conference.

Preseason All Conference
No Privateers were selected as members of the Preseason All Conference first team.

Roster

Schedule
Sources:

|-
!colspan=9 style=";"| Non-conference regular season

|-
!colspan=9 style=";"| Southland regular season

|-
!colspan=12 style=| 2023 Jersey Mike's Subs Southland Basketball Tournament
|-

See also
2022–23 New Orleans Privateers men's basketball team

References

New Orleans Privateers women's basketball seasons
New Orleans
New Orleans Privateers women's basketball team
New Orleans Privateers women's basketball team